Matti Aho (29 May 1934 – 23 February 1984) was a Finnish boxer. He competed in the men's light heavyweight event at the 1960 Summer Olympics. At the 1960 Summer Olympics, he defeated Colm McCoy of Ireland in the Round of 32, before losing to Petar Spasov of Bulgaria in the Round of 16.

References

External links
 

1934 births
1984 deaths
People from Vyborg District
Finnish male boxers
Olympic boxers of Finland
Boxers at the 1960 Summer Olympics
Light-heavyweight boxers